Salvador Pablo Martínez della Rocca (born 10 November 1945) is a Mexican politician affiliated with the Party of the Democratic Revolution. As of 2014 he served as Deputy of the LVI and LIX Legislatures of the Mexican Congress representing the Federal District.

References

1945 births
Living people
Politicians from Sinaloa
People from Los Mochis
National Autonomous University of Mexico alumni
Party of the Democratic Revolution politicians
20th-century Mexican politicians
21st-century Mexican politicians
Deputies of the LIX Legislature of Mexico
Members of the Chamber of Deputies (Mexico) for Mexico City